Black President is a song by South African singer Brenda Fassie. It is the sixth track on her sixth studio album, Black President (1990), It was written by Sello "Checco" Twala, Brenda Fassie, and produced by Twala and released on February 8, 1990 through CCP Records.

The song was written about Nelson Mandela, who was arrested by the South African apartheid government with his comrades.

Background

The song was one of the tracks that were written around Mandela's release from prison, who was imprisoned in Robben Island (1963–1990) for involvement in political activities in South Africa. The details of Mandela's release described in the song were speculative, as the song's release predated Mandela's by 4 days.

Music videos

The accompanying music video for Black President released in 1990, In videos includes photographs and tribute clips of Nelson Mandela, It was later made available through YouTube.

References

Anti-apartheid songs
Songs about Nelson Mandela
Songs about South Africa
Songs about prison
1990 songs